Bimal Adhikari (born 2 April 1990) is a Nepalese model, dancer, lyricist, and musician. Adhikari was born in Chapakot- Syangja Nepal.Debuted from song "timilai pardina runa" on 2010 Adhikari mainly appears on music videos of Nepali folk and modern songs. His song with Himal Sagar and Anu Chaudhary A hora maya (written and composed music by himself ) was one of his hits.

About
Adhikari was born in Chapakot Syangja . Adhikari came to Kathmandu after completing his S.L.C and started working for marketing company, however after few years he started to taking dance classes which grew his interest in musical field.

Awards

Discography
 A Hora Maya - with Himal Sagar
 Pachheuri Lisyo -with Arjun Sapkota , Samikshya Adhikari , Rabin Lamichhane 
 Pipa Chheuma Bar -with Prabisha Adhikari
Kalle Bolayo - with Melina Rai
A Bhupu Maya 
Ke Bhanau Hajura - with Melina Rai
 Hare Bhagwan Hare - with Bishnu Majhi
 Jhyalaima - with Bishnu Majhi
 Suna Sabaile Suna
 Chhata
 Ke Yesto Huna Lekheko
 Nagara Pir Maya
 Aaja Bhanda Bholi Maya
 Dodharaima Pareko Chhu Ma Ta
 A Timro Maya
 Kaha Chhau Timi 
 Kina Dukchhas Ye Mutu

References 

Living people
Nepalese male models
People from Syangja District
21st-century Nepalese dancers
1990 births